Pineo is a surname. Notable people with the surname include:

 Abraham Pineo Gesner (1797–1864), Canadian physician and geologist
 Henry Gesner Pineo Jr. (1830–1874), Canadian politician
 Richard Pineo (born 1975), English cricket player